The 1989 Bulgarian Cup Final was played at the Slavi Aleksiev Stadium in Pleven on 24 May 1989, and was contested between the sides of CSKA Sofia and Chernomorets Burgas. The match was won by CSKA.

Match

Details

See also
1988–89 A Group
1989 Bulgarian Supercup

References 

Bulgarian Cup finals
PFC CSKA Sofia matches
Cup Final